The Jago River  is a  river located in the North Slope Borough, Alaska. Its headwaters are in the Brooks Range, and it is named after a Lieutenant Jago of a geological survey. It drains into the Arctic Ocean. It contains deposits of azurite and malachite.

References

Rivers of North Slope Borough, Alaska